Denice is an Italian commune.

Denice may also refer to:

Denicé, a French commune
Denice (given name), a list of people with the given name Denice

See also

Denise (disambiguation)
Denyce
Denyse